Somerleyton Hall is a country house and  estate near Somerleyton and Lowestoft in Suffolk, England owned and lived in by Hugh Crossley, 4th Baron Somerleyton, originally designed by John Thomas. The hall is Grade II* listed on the National Heritage List for England, and its landscaped park and formal gardens are also Grade II* listed on the Register of Historic Parks and Gardens. The formal gardens cover . Inspired by Knepp Wildland, Somerleyton is rewilding  of the estate to which he has introduced free-roaming cattle, large black pigs and Exmoor ponies.

History
In 1240 a manor house was built on the site of Somerleyton Hall by Sir Peter Fitzosbert, whose daughter married into the Jernegan family. The male line of the Fitzosberts ended, and the Jernegans held the estate until 1604. In 1604 John Wentworth bought the estate. He transformed Somerleyton Hall into a typical East Anglian Tudor-Jacobean mansion. It then passed to the Garney family. The next owner was Admiral Sir Thomas Allin, a native of Lowestoft. He took part in the Battle of Lowestoft (1665) and the Battle of Solebay at Southwold in 1672. Eventually, the male line of that family also died out.

In 1843 Somerleyton Hall and Park were bought by the prosperous entrepreneur and MP Samuel Morton Peto. For the next seven years he carried out extensive rebuilding, creating an Anglo-Italian architecture masterpiece. Paintings were specially commissioned for the house, and the gardens and grounds were completely redesigned. Peto had garden features designed by William Andrews Nesfield and Joseph Paxton. Peto's son, Harold Peto, became a noted garden-designer, but it is not known whether he was influenced by the gardens of Somerleyton. 

In 1863 the Somerleyton estate was sold to Sir Francis Crossley of Halifax, West Yorkshire, a carpet manufacturer, who, like Peto, was a philanthropist and a Member of Parliament. Sir Francis' son Savile was created Baron Somerleyton in 1916. The family motto is 'Everything that is good comes from above'. Hugh Crossley, 4th Baron Somerleyton inherited the hall in 2012 where he lives with his family.

The lake at Somerleyton Hall was used by Christopher Cockerell, the inventor of the hovercraft, to carry out his early experiments in 1955.

Description

Hall
The hall is a Grade II* listed building. It was designed by John Thomas, an architect who had previously worked for Prince Albert, and was completed in 1850. The clock tower houses a clock designed by Benjamin Vulliamy. It is on the National Heritage List for England.

Formal gardens
Landscaped park and formal gardens are also Grade II* listed on the Register of Historic Parks and Gardens. The formal gardens cover  and form part of the  estate (7.7 square miles). They feature a yew hedge maze, one of the finest in Britain, created by William Andrews Nesfield in 1846, and a ridge and furrow greenhouse designed by Joseph Paxton, the architect of The Crystal Palace. The more informal areas of the garden feature rhododendrons and azaleas and a fine collection of specimen trees. The kitchen garden and the stable court are both listed Grade II*. The ridge and furrow glasshouses north of the kitchen garden are listed Grade II. Several garden ornaments and statuary are listed; these include the statue of Atalanta, the group of four urns around the sundial, as well as the sundial, all are listed Grade II. In the formal gardens, the four urns in the centre and the four stone troughs are both listed Grade II. The remains of the Winter Garden and the boundary walling to the formal gardens are listed Grade II. The cistern at the south of the terrace to and the retaining wall to the garden front are listed Grade II. The screen wall to entrance front of the hall is Grade II listed. The South Lodge and the gates to Somerleyton Hall are listed Grade II.

Estate
Inspired by the success of Knepp Wildland, a pioneering rewilding project started by Sir Charles Burrell, 10th Baronet in West Sussex, Somerleyton has fenced and is rewilding  of the  estate (7.7 square miles), has introduced large black pigs, Exmoor ponies and 100 free-roaming cattle. Somerleyton is a founding trustee of WildEast, a charitable foundation that promotes regenerative farming and rewilding in the East Anglia.

In popular culture 
In 1998 Lord and Lady Somerleyton commissioned the English artist Jonathan Myles-Lea, a specialist in country houses, gardens and estates, to paint Somerleyton Hall. The house and the maze, where the narrator becomes lost, feature prominently in W. G. Sebald's 1995 novel-memoir The Rings of Saturn. The house and grounds were used to stand in for Sandringham House in Stephen Poliakoff's 2003 television drama The Lost Prince, and the house again in Peter Morgan's 2020 series The Crown. The house and its grounds featured as the principal location in "Neck", the sixth episode in the first series of Tales of the Unexpected (1979).

Gallery

References

External links

Somerleyton Hall Garden

Country houses in Suffolk
Grade II* listed buildings in Suffolk
Grade II* listed houses
Grade II* listed parks and gardens in Suffolk
Historic house museums in Suffolk
Houses completed in 1844
Italianate architecture in England
Jacobethan architecture
Mazes
Waveney District